Pierre Le Gros refers to one of two French sculptors, father and son:

Pierre Le Gros the Elder, 1629–1714
Pierre Le Gros the Younger, 1666–1719